Sebastiano Pelle (born August 7, 1954) is an Italian criminal belonging to the 'Ndrangheta, a Mafia-type organization in Calabria (Italy). He was on the "list of most wanted fugitives in Italy" of the ministry of the Interior, until his arrest on November 9, 2011, in Reggio Calabria.

Background
Pelle was born in San Luca, Calabria. He is a nephew of Antonio Pelle, the patriarch of the San Luca locale and the 'Ndrangheta capo crimine, the titular head of the organisation, although with little effective power. According to investigators Sebastiano Pelle returned to San Luca to take over when his uncle died in November 2009.

He was wanted since 1995 for membership of a criminal association aimed at trafficking weapons and drugs internationally, as well as for other crimes. Pelle has been sentenced to 14 years in prison. In 2006, investigations were extended internationally for his extradition. Pelle spent years abroad managing the cocaine trade for the San Luca clans.

See also
List of fugitives from justice who disappeared

References

1954 births
Fugitives 
Fugitives wanted by Italy
Living people
'Ndranghetisti
People from San Luca